Transportation in Greater St. Louis, Missouri includes road, rail, ship, and air transportation modes connecting the bi-state St. Louis metropolitan area with surrounding communities throughout the Midwest, national transportation networks, and international locations. The Greater St. Louis region also supports a multi-modal transportation network that includes bus, paratransit, and light rail service in addition to shared-use paths, bike lanes and greenways.

Roads, highways, and bridges

The city of St. Louis has several major arterial roadways and boulevards. Important north-south routes include Broadway, Tucker Boulevard (which turns into Gravois Avenue and runs southwest to the city limits), Jefferson Avenue, Grand Boulevard, Vandeventer Avenue, Kingshighway Boulevard, and finally Skinker Boulevard. The latter two run on the east and west edges of Forest Park, respectively. Several of the city's primary arterials also continue into the St. Louis County suburbs. Some of those routes include West Florissant Avenue, Natural Bridge Avenue, and Dr. Martin Luther King Drive (which turns into St. Charles Rock Road), all of which carry traffic from downtown to the North County suburbs. Others are Clayton Road, Manchester Avenue, Chippewa Street (which turns into Watson Road), and South Broadway (eventually turning into Telegraph Road), all of which carry traffic from the city to the West and South County suburbs.

Other major corridors between the city and county include Market Street-Forest Park and Olive Boulevard. Market Street begins at the Arch Grounds and continues west, eventually turning into Forest Park Avenue in Midtown. After crossing Kingshighway in the Central West End, the name changes to Forest Park Parkway and the road takes on characteristics more similar to a divided highway until it reaches its terminus at Interstate 170 near downtown Clayton. Olive Boulevard, which is unrelated to downtown's Olive Street, begins at Skinker Boulevard on the city-county line and runs due west through the suburbs of University City, Olivette, Creve Coeur, and Chesterfield where it turns south and changes to Clarkson Road at Interstate 64. From here it continues through Clarkson Valley before ending at Manchester Road in Ellisville, Missouri.

Other county arterials include major north-south routes like Big Bend Boulevard, Hanley Road, Laclede Station Road, Lindbergh Boulevard, and Ballas Road.

Page Boulevard begins as a city street near midtown St. Louis continuing west and changing to Page Avenue at the city-county line. From here it travels through the suburbs of Wellston, Pagedale, Hanley Hills, Vinita Park, Overland, and Maryland Heights, Missouri. After its intersection with Lindbergh Boulevard, Page takes on the characteristics of a wide highway with stoplights at Westport Center Drive and Schuetz Road. West of Schuetz near Interstate 270 Page Avenue becomes Highway 364 and runs as a controlled-access highway through the communities of St. Charles, St. Peters, Cottleville, O'Fallon, and Lake St. Louis, Missouri, where it ends at Interstate 64.

Other major routes in St. Charles County include 1st Capitol Drive, 5th Street, Muegge Road, Mid Rivers Mall Drive, Mexico Road, and routes K and N.

Primary routes in the Metro East (Illinois) suburbs include Missouri Avenue, Kingshighway, St. Clair Avenue, Mississippi Avenue, Illinois Street, and Green Mount Road in St. Clair County. Major routes in Madison County include Edwardsville Road, Nameoki Road, Troy Road, University Drive, and Lewis and Clark Boulevard.

The Great River Road enters the region on Illinois Route 3 in the south and generally travels through the American Bottom. Eventually it joins Lewis and Clark Boulevard and then Berm Highway towards Alton, Illinois. North of Alton the Great River Road aligns with Illinois Route 100 and runs alongside the Mississippi River to Grafton before exiting the region.

Interstates and highways 

Among the primary Interstates, Interstate 70 travels west to east through Warren, St. Charles, and St. Louis counties and the city of St. Louis, leaving Missouri over the Stan Musial Veterans Memorial Bridge into St. Clair County, Illinois. Interstate 55 travels south to north through Jefferson and St. Louis counties and the city of St. Louis, briefly merging with Interstate 44, then crossing the Poplar Street Bridge. Interstate 64's western terminus is in Wentzville, Missouri, at its interchange with I-70 and U.S. Route 61. From here it shares an alignment with U.S. Route 40 as it crosses into St. Louis County on the Daniel Boone Bridge and then continues through the city and crosses the Poplar Street Bridge with I-55. After entering East St. Louis, Illinois, I-64 splits off towards eastern St. Clair County and I-70 and I-55 share an alignment until they reach Troy, Illinois. From here I-55 continues north toward Chicago while I-70 continues east toward Indianapolis. I-44 enters the St. Louis region in Sullivan, Missouri, and runs eastward through Franklin and St. Louis counties, briefly merging with I-55 in the city of St. Louis, and terminating at I-70.

The "beltway" serving Greater St. Louis is the combination of Interstate 270 and Interstate 255, the former a mostly western bypass of St. Louis City. I-270 crosses into Illinois at the northern edge of the city on the New Chain of Rocks Bridge and continues through Madison County, Illinois, until ending at the I-55 and I-70 interchange near Troy. In southern St. Louis County, I-270 ends at the I-55 interchange near Mehlville, Missouri, where the roadway becomes I-255 and continues east across the Mississippi River on the Jefferson Barracks Bridge into Monroe County, Illinois. Here it turns north, traveling through St. Clair County until ending at I-270 in Madison County. Known locally as the "Inner Belt Expressway," Interstate 170 runs entirely within St. Louis County, traveling southerly from I-270 in Hazelwood to I-64 in Richmond Heights.

Other secondary highways in the area include Highway 141 (originally designed as a western "outer belt" to I-270) and highways 364 and 370 which serve suburban St. Charles County.

U.S. Route 50 enters Greater St. Louis near Gerald, eastward through Franklin County; at Union, it meets I-44, both continuing to Sunset Hills in St. Louis County. US 50, eastward, merges with US 61 and U.S. Route 67 (Lindbergh Boulevard). The US 50/US 61/US 67 concurrency continues to the I-55/I-255/I-270 interchange, where they follow I-255 across the Mississippi River. US 50 continues east through Monroe County into St. Clair County, traveling concurrently with I-64 into O'Fallon, where US 50 splits, continuing through Clinton County.

US 61 enters the region from the south, paralleling I-55 in Jefferson County, continuing to Festus where it travels concurrently with US 67. US 61/US 67 continues into St. Louis County until reaching the I-55/I-255/I-270 interchange, where US 61/US 67 follows Lindbergh Boulevard. US 61 continues north into Frontenac, where it joins westbound I-64. US 61 continues west through St. Louis County and into St. Charles County, then leaves I-64 in Wentzville and continues north into Lincoln County and beyond.

US 67 enters the region northbound in Farmington, Missouri, where it continues into Festus, traveling concurrently with US 61 and paralleling I-55. US 67 splits from US 61 in Frontenac with US 67 continuing north on Lindbergh Boulevard. At Missouri Route 367, US 67 turns north, crosses the Missouri River on the Clark Bridge into Illinois and passes through Madison and Jersey counties before leaving the region.

The Greater St. Louis region is also served by several state highways that are listed in the table below.

Bridges, viaducts, and tunnels 

The Greater St. Louis region is surrounded by rivers, creeks, and other tributaries requiring multiple bridges and viaducts to travel across the bi-state area. The largest of these bridges carry interstates across rivers while the smaller viaducts carry major local routes over creeks, railroads, and other obstructions. Missouri's only traffic tunnel carries Lindbergh Boulevard under Runway 11/29 at St. Louis-Lambert International Airport.

Public Transportation

Bus

Local bus service in the greater St. Louis region is provided by MetroBus and Madison County Transit. MetroBus has 47 routes connecting destinations in the city of St. Louis and St. Louis County in addition to 12 routes connecting destinations in St. Clair County, Illinois. Madison County Transit has 28 routes connecting destinations across Madison County, Illinois. In addition, Madison County Transit runs express buses to the Civic Center and Emerson Park transit centers where passengers can connect with MetroLink trains.

Light rail

Fixed rail public transportation in the St. Louis region consists of two light rail lines serving the same stations in the central city and then branching to different destinations outside the city. Both lines enter the city on its western edge north of Forest Park or on the Eads Bridge in downtown St. Louis from Illinois. The whole system operates in an independent right of way, with at-grade, elevated, and subway track in the region. All stations are independent entry and all platforms feature level boarding with trains. Rail service is provided by Metro Transit, an enterprise of the Bi-State Development Agency, and is funded by sales taxes levied in the city and St. Louis and St. Clair counties.

Loop Trolley 

The Loop Trolley is a 2.2-mile (3.5 km), 10-station heritage streetcar line that runs from City Hall in University City to the Missouri History Museum in St. Louis' Forest Park. The line travels along Delmar Bouleverd through the popular Delmar Loop district and DeBaliviere Avenue between Delmar and Forest Park. The trolley has stops at both the Forest Park-DeBaliviere and Delmar Loop MetroLink stations. On February 18, 2022, Metro Transit's board voted to take over operation of the Loop Trolley after several financial setbacks and closures. Metro reopened the Loop Trolley for operation on August 4, 2022. On August 21, 2022, the East-West Gateway Council of Governments voted to award Metro a $1.26 million grant to continue to operate the trolley on a seasonal schedule for the next several years.

National Connections 
The Gateway Multimodal Transportation Center functions as the region's primary transportation hub, linking the city's light rail system, local bus system, passenger rail service, and national bus service in one central station. Passenger rail service is provided by Amtrak with trains to Chicago via the Lincoln Service, to Kansas City via the Missouri River Runner, and to San Antonio via the Texas Eagle. National bus service in the city is provided by Greyhound Lines, Amtrak Thruway Motorcoach, and Megabus.

Rideshare and Taxis 
Taxicab service in the region is provided by private companies regulated by the Metropolitan Taxicab Commission. Rates vary by vehicle type, size, passengers and distance, and by regulation all taxicab fares must be calculated using a taximeter and be payable in cash or credit card. Solicitation by a driver is prohibited, although a taxicab may be hailed on the street or at a stand. The St. Louis region is also served by rideshare companies like Lyft, Uber, Lime, and Bird.

Ferries 
The St. Louis metropolitan area is home to several ferry services that carry passengers across rivers between Missouri and Illinois. The seasonal Grafton Ferry travels across the Mississippi River between St. Charles, Missouri, and Grafton, Illinois, cutting travel times between the two communities by roughly 30 minutes. The Calhoun Ferry Company operates two ferry services on the Mississippi River. One is a year round service between St. Charles and Calhoun County called the Golden Eagle Ferry. The other operates between Winfield, Missouri, and Batchtown, Illinois, when demand is high enough to require it. The Illinois Department of Transportation also operates two free, year round ferries in the St. Louis area. The first is the Brussels Ferry that crosses the Illinois River just west of its confluence with the Mississippi near Grafton, while the second one crosses the Illinois River near Kampsville.

Bicycle and pedestrian 
The St. Louis area is served by several systems of off-street shared-use paths, on-street bicycle lanes, and greenways providing residents alternative modes of transportation.

Great Rivers Greenway District 

The Great Rivers Greenway District was established in November 2000 by the passage of Proposition C – The Clean Water, Safe Parks and Community Trails Initiative – in the city of St. Louis, St. Louis County and St. Charles County, Missouri. Proposition C created a one tenth of one cent sales tax devoted to the creation of an interconnected system of greenways, parks and trails. In its first 20 years the agency has built more than 128 miles of greenways connecting parks, rivers, schools, neighborhoods, business districts and transit.

Major greenways include:
 Brickline Greenway - The plan for the Brickline Greenway, formerly known as the Chouteau Greenway, calls for 20 miles of trails and green space connecting 17 neighborhoods across the City of St. Louis. It will connect Fairground Park in the north to Tower Grove Park in the south and Forest Park in the west to Gateway Arch National Park in the east. The project planners aim to knit together diverse communities through the greenway to overcome barriers that have fragmented the city over time. The plan incorporates input from citizens on strategies to promote economic growth and equitable outcomes.
 Centennial Greenway - The Centennial Greenway will extend from Forest Park in the City of St. Louis to St. Charles County. Three sections have been completed. From Forest Park the trail runs through the Washington University campus to Delmar Boulevard and Vernon Avenue in University City. Another section extends from Shaw Park in Clayton north to Olive Boulevard. A third section goes from the Katy Trail to the St. Charles Heritage Museum and connects east across the Missouri River to Creve Coeur Lake Memorial Park via the Creve Coeur Connector Trail.
 Gravois Greenway: Grants Trail - Grant's Trail on the Gravois Greenway runs along Gravois Creek on the rail corridor of the former Kirkwood-Carondelet branch of the Missouri Pacific Railroad. Trailnet, a St. Louis-based organization that advocates for active communities and safe spaces for walking and bicycling, purchased the corridor in 1991 and built the first six miles of Grant's Trail which opened in 1994. Since 2006, Great Rivers Greenway has extended the trail to reach 10 miles from Kirkwood to the River des Peres Greenway near Interstate 55 and added two miles of trail in Officer Blake C. Snyder Memorial Park, adjacent to Grant’s Trail. Points of interest on the greenway include the Ulysses S. Grant National Historic Site, Grant's Farm and the Thomas Sappington House Museum.
 Mississippi Greenway - The Mississippi Greenway, formerly known as the Confluence Greenway, is planned as a 32 mile corridor that will connect with the Missouri, Maline, River des Peres and Meramec Greenways. Three sections have been built. The Riverfront Trail runs from the downtown Mississippi riverfront north to the old Chain of Rocks Bridge. At 5,353 feet long, the old Chain of Rocks Bridge was part of Route 66 in 1936 and is one of the world’s longest bicycle and pedestrian bridges. Another segment connects Jefferson Barracks County Park with River City Casino near the River des Peres Greenway. A third section runs through Cliff Cave County Park overlooking the Mississippi River.

Bike St. Louis 
Bike St. Louis is a plan sponsored by the city of St. Louis to make local neighborhoods more friendly for those who bicycle for transportation, fitness, or fun. Since its launch in 2000, more than 135 miles of cycling routes have been added to city streets.

Katy Trail 

The Katy Trail is the country's longest recreational rail trail. It runs , largely along the northern bank of the Missouri River, in the right-of-way of the former Missouri–Kansas–Texas Railroad. Open year-round from sunrise to sunset, it serves hikers, joggers, and cyclists. Its hard, flat surface is of "limestone pug" (crushed limestone). It enters the St. Louis region near Washington, primarily running along the Missouri River passing through historic downtown St. Charles before terminating at Machens Road, 3-miles (4.8 km) from Portage Des Sioux. The Katy Trail connects to the local Great Rivers Greenway network at many points, including major bridges (Daniel Boone, Discovery, and Veterans Memorial) which provide access into St. Louis County. Plans are underway to add another  unused section of the Chicago, Rock Island and Pacific to Rock Island Trail State Park, which, with the Katy, would create a  cross-state trail network.

Airports

Greater St. Louis is severed by over a dozen airports, although the vast majority of its air traffic is generated at St. Louis-Lambert International Airport.

St. Louis-Lambert International Airport (STL) 

St. Louis-Lambert International Airport, owned and operated by the city of St. Louis, is 14 miles (23 km) northwest of downtown along I-70 between I-170 and I-270 in St. Louis County. It is the largest and busiest airport in the state. In 2019, it served nearly 16 million passengers with more than 259 daily departures to 78 nonstop domestic and international locations. Named for Albert Bond Lambert, an Olympic medalist and prominent St. Louis aviator, the airport rose to international prominence in the 20th century thanks to its association with Charles Lindbergh, its groundbreaking air traffic control (ATC), its status as the primary hub of Trans World Airlines (TWA), and its iconic terminal. The airport's largest airline is Southwest Airlines with nearly 60% of the market share followed by American Airlines with 12%.

MidAmerica St. Louis Airport (BLV) 

MidAmerica St. Louis Airport is a public use airport next to Scott Air Force Base. It is 16 miles (26 km) east of the central business district of Belleville and 21 miles (33 km) east of downtown St. Louis in St. Clair County, Illinois. The airport is the secondary domestic passenger airport for the metropolitan area and has operated as a joint use airport since beginning operations in November 1997. MidAmerica is currently served by Allegiant Air and offers general aviation and cargo facilities and in 2021 saw 318,000 passengers. In 2021, construction began on a 41,000 square foot expansion of the terminal building that will add two additional gates. It is expected to open in December of 2022.

General Aviation 
Other airports serving the St. Louis metropolitan area include:
 Creve Coeur Airport
 Spirit of St. Louis Airport
 St. Charles County Smartt Airport
 St. Louis Downtown Airport
 St. Louis-Metro East Airport
 St. Louis Regional Airport

Port of Metropolitan St. Louis

The Port of Metropolitan St. Louis offers a 15-mile stretch of the Mississippi River that is home to 16 barge-transfer facilities that, at total capacity, can handle 150 barges a day – the highest level of capacity anywhere along the Mississippi River.

The St. Louis region’s port system is the second-largest inland port system in the United States, and was ranked the most efficient port system by the U.S. Army Corps of Engineers. The St. Louis regional port system is responsible for 8% of the 855 miles of the Mississippi River, but carries one-third of the river’s total freight.

Other features of the Port of Metropolitan St. Louis include:
 Northernmost ice-free and lock-free port on the Mississippi River
 Served by six Class I railroads, seven interstates, and two international airports
 Access to two Foreign Trade Zones
 Includes the City of St. Louis Port District
Other port facilities in metropolitan St. Louis include America's Central Port in Granite City, Illinois, Kaskaskia Port in Randolph County, and the Municipal River Terminal in the city of St. Louis. In Jefferson County, Missouri, Hawtex Development Group hopes to develop a container-on-vessel port at Herculaneum's Riverview Commerce Park. The proposed port would cover approximately 300 acres and open in late 2024.

The Chain of Rocks Canal and Locks No. 27 allow river traffic to bypass a portion of the Mississippi River that is unnavigable in low water due to an anticlinal exposure of bedrock in the river—a "chain of rocks". The 8.4-mile (13.5 km) canal, 1,200-foot (370 m) main lock, and 600-foot (180 m) auxiliary lock opened in the early 1950s to allow a bypass of the Chain of Rocks lying in the main channel of the Mississippi River. Locks No. 27 are the only locks south of the confluence of the Mississippi River and Missouri River. As such, the locks move more cargo than any other navigation structure on the river.

St. Louis Regional Freightway 
An enterprise of the Bi-State Development Agency, the Regional Freightway was founded in 2014 to enhance the St. Louis region’s standing as an international freight hub. The Freightway works to optimize the region’s freight network and strengthen modal flexibility, support workforce development initiatives that build our talent supply chain, and raise awareness about the global connectivity the St. Louis region offers.

Railroads 

Greater St. Louis is the nation's third-largest rail hub with freight rail service provided on tracks owned by BNSF Railway, Canadian National Railway, CSX Transportation, Kansas City Southern, Norfolk Southern Railway, Union Pacific Railroad, and the Terminal Railroad Association of St. Louis. The Terminal Railroad is a switching and terminal railroad jointly owned by all the major rail carriers in St. Louis. The company operates 30 diesel-electric locomotives to move railcars around the classification yards, deliver railcars to local industries, and ready trains for departure. The TRRA processes and dispatches a significant portion of railroad traffic in the metropolitan area and owns and operates a network of rail bridges and tunnels including the MacArthur Bridge and the Merchants Bridge.

Future projects

Bridges and highways

Chain of Rocks Bridge 
On August 23, 2022, the Missouri and Illinois departments of transportation awarded contracts to begin construction on a replacement for the "New" Chain of Rocks Bridge and interchange at Riverview Drive. Construction is expected to begin in the fall of 2022. The replacement bridge will include space for six 12-foot lanes and four 10-foot shoulders.

Future64 
In 2022, the Missouri Department of Transportation began a Planning and Environmental Linkages (PEL) study on Interstate 64 between Kingshighway Boulevard and Jefferson Avenue. This PEL study will look at the potential impact future projects will have on the environment, the community, and connectivity in the area.

Light rail

MidAmerica Airport 
 A 5.2-mile (8.4 km) expansion of the Red Line from Shiloh-Scott to MidAmerica St. Louis Airport in Mascoutah received $96 million in funding from the State of Illinois in 2019. The expansion will include a 2.6-mile double-track section, a 2.6-mile single-track section and a passenger station at the end of the alignment at MidAmerica Airport. Design work was completed in the summer of 2022 and a request for proposals was released that November. Construction on the expansion is expected to begin by March 2023 and be operational by spring 2025.

Northside/Southside - St. Louis City 
 This 5.6-mile (9 km) expansion would serve approximately 14 stations between Grand Boulevard in North St. Louis and Chippewa Street in South St. Louis running primarily on Jefferson Avenue. Proposed frequency is 10 to 20 minutes operating between 5 a.m. and 1 a.m., 7 days a week. It would provide a fixed rail upgrade to Metro's high-volume #11 (Chippewa) and #4 (Natural Bridge) bus routes. A Locally Preferred Alternative (LPA) is expected to be selected in the Fall of 2022.

St. Louis County Connector 
 This extension would be a Phase II to Northside/Southside and continue from the North Grand Boulevard station along Natural Bridge Avenue toward North St. Louis County. Higher-volume bus stops further west along Metro's #4 (Natural Bridge) bus route support further expansion into North St. Louis County. Final routing, station location, etc. have yet to be determined for this segment. It is being studied by Bi-State and St. Louis County as of the Summer of 2022.

The North-South corridor will not feature the rapid transit like characteristics of the Red and Blue lines and will instead be similar other to light rail lines in the US, such as Houston or Phoenix, and would be separate from the rest of the system. Because of this, an infill station to facilitate transfers will be constructed on the Red and Blue Lines where they intersect with the new Jefferson Avenue alignment.

Lambert Airport 
In early 2022, airport officials released a plan that would consolidate both existing terminals at the current Terminal 1 site. The proposal would gradually demolish concourses A, B, and C and build a new linear concourse with 62 gates in their place, while retaining the iconic domed terminal building. Following the completion, Terminal 2 would be repurposed.

See also

References 

 
St. Louis
St. Louis, Missouri